Sedeño is a Spanish surname. Notable people with the surname include:

Antonio Sedeño (died 1538), Spanish conquistador and governor of Trinidad
Diego Ramírez Sedeño de Fuenleal (1524–1573), Spanish Roman Catholic bishop

See also
Sedeño River, a river of Mexico

Spanish-language surnames